Henriette Christine Hahn-Brinckmann (1862–1934) was a Danish-German painter and lithographer. Among her most interesting works are those created with Japanese woodcutting tools which her husband, the museum curator Justus Brinckmann, brought to Hamburg.

Biography
Born on 12 September 1862 in Copenhagen, Henriette Christine Hahn was the daughter of Heinrich Carl Hahn, a sea captain, and Caroline Vilhelmine Nielsen. She studied art at Zartmann's School, continuing her studies in Dresden and later at a private school in Paris (1892–94). In 1887, she began working as an art teacher at a girls school in Hamburg, headed by the German museum director and art historian Justus Brinkmann. They married in 1901.

Hahn-Brinckmannn's work consisted mainly of portraits in the Realistic style she had learnt during her studies. From 1894, she created a considerable number of Art Nouveau woodcuts. She also worked on textile design and painted miniatures on ivory. She was not active as an artist while she was married but following her husband's death in 1914, she resumed her work.

Among her most notable works are her Japanese-inspired woodcut prints with up to six colours which she painted in the late 1890s. Hahn-Brinckmann created them using woodcut tools from Japan, specially imported by Justus Brinkmann. The works were widely exhibited, in Hamburg, Dresden, Copenhagen and at the 1900 Paris World Exhibition, where she was awarded a silver medal. Four examples of her Japanese-style woodcuts can be seen at the Vejen Art Museum in the south of Jutland.

Henriette Hahn-Brinckmann died in Hamburg-Bergedorf on 2 April 1934.

References

1862 births
1934 deaths
19th-century Danish painters
20th-century Danish painters
19th-century German painters
20th-century German painters
19th-century Danish women artists
20th-century Danish women artists
20th-century Danish artists
19th-century German women artists
20th-century German women artists
Artists from Copenhagen
Danish emigrants to Germany
Danish women painters
German women painters
Artists from Hamburg